Ausdroid, formerly known as Android Australia, is a site containing news about smartphones, smart accessories and personal technology. The site started writing about just the Android operating system, but has expanded to a broader personal technology coverage. The site is produced by Ausdroid Media Pty Ltd.

The site's main focus is a news blog that contains news regarding Android, Google Inc. and its parent company Alphabet Inc. along with its web cloud-based ChromeOS operating system.

Staff 
Ausdroid has two editorial staff:
 Chris Rowland: Publisher and Editor
 Phil Tann: Deputy Editor

Writing Staff 
 Phil Tann: Principal
 Alex Dennis: Journalist
 Duncan Jaffrey: Journalist
 Neerav Bhatt: Journalist
 Alex Choros

References

External links 
 

Computing websites
Australian news websites